Jim Drucker (born ) is a former commissioner of the Continental Basketball Association, former commissioner of the Arena Football League, and founder and owner of NewKadia.com, the world's largest online-only comic-book seller.

Biography

Drucker was born in Brooklyn, New York, to Ukrainian parents and is Jewish. His father, Norm Drucker, was a New York City public school teacher and principal, and then a long-time referee in the National Basketball Association (NBA) and American Basketball Association (ABA).

Drucker grew up in East Meadow in Long Island, New York. He attended SUNY Buffalo, obtaining a bachelor's degree in political science and communication, and then a law degree from Duke Law School. He next taught at the Temple University School of Law. He is married to Fran Drucker and now lives in Plymouth Meeting, Pennsylvania.

Drucker was commissioner of the Continental Basketball Association (CBA), a precursor to the NBA G League, from 1978 to 1986; while in the position, he acquired additional coverage by offering the first-ever million dollar half-court shot. He was ESPN's on-camera legal analyst from 1989-1994. 

He was commissioner of the Arena Football League (AFL) for three seasons, starting in 1994,  during which time, the league expanded from 11 to 18 teams.

In 1999, with his own collection of 850 comic books, Drucker founded NewKadia.com, the world's largest online-only comic-book seller. In 2017, it sold 250,000 comic books.

References 

Living people
Year of birth missing (living people)
People from East Meadow, New York
Continental Basketball Association commissioners
University at Buffalo alumni
Duke University School of Law alumni
ESPN people
American people of Ukrainian descent
Businesspeople from Brooklyn
Sportspeople from Brooklyn
People from Montgomery County, Pennsylvania
Arena Football League commissioners
Temple University faculty
American people of Ukrainian-Jewish descent
Jewish American sportspeople